Katze may refer to

 Katze (village), a village in Burma
 the German word for "cat"